Eric Sydney Spooner  (2 March 1891 – 3 June 1952) was an Australian politician.

Early life

Spooner was born in the Sydney suburb of Waterloo and educated at Christ Church St Laurence School. At 14 he became a telegraph messenger and studied at night at the University of Sydney to gain a diploma in economics and commerce. He married Mary Berry in December 1919. He established the accounting firm of Hungerford, Spooner & Co in 1922 with his brother Bill, a Liberal cabinet minister from 1949 to 1964.

State politics

Spooner was elected the seat of Ryde in 1932 and became an honorary minister in the United Australia Party government of Bertram Stevens. He subsequently became Assistant Treasurer and Minister for Local Government. From 1935 he was Minister for Local Government, Secretary for Public Works and deputy leader of the United Australia Party (NSW Branch). He was responsible for establishing employment-creating schemes and the Sydney County Council, a gas and electricity supplier. In 1939 he opposed budget cuts and resigned from Cabinet on 21 July. On 1 August, he moved a moved a motion that was critical of the proposal to cut government spending in order to restrain a growing deficit, with Spooner personally attacking Stevens, describing him as running the party as a dictatorship. The coalition had a large majority in the assembly, however the motion was passed 43 to 41, with nine United Australia members joining Spooner in voting against the government. Spooner's ambitions to replace Stevens as leader were thwarted as the Leader of the Country Party, Michael Bruxner, refused to join a coalition with him and Alexander Mair succeeded Stevens as Premier.

Spooner bathing costume

As the NSW Minister for Local Government, Spooner introduced an ordinance, commencing on 1 September 1935, regulating the design of swimsuits, principally aimed at males who were wearing swim trunks which left their chests bare.  The lowering of the upper part of a costume to show a bared chest was considered by some people, including the Bega branch of the Country Women's Association, as "disgraceful, and [meriting] rigorous attention". A clergyman maintained that "if men were allowed to wear shorts, girls would want shorts and brassieres and that would lead to a steady increase of undesirable conduct on our beaches".

Protests were received from the Surf Life Saving Association of Australia, and the ordinance was derided as inappropriate for competitive swimming.  The prohibitive purchase cost of the required swimming costume was also mentioned. Spooner noted the change legalised costumes currently in use and removed the older "neck to knee" costumes ordinance, dating from 1910.

The State of Victoria followed Spooner's regulation.  The law was still in effect in NSW in 1950.

Federal politics and later life

In August 1940 Spooner resigned his seat and won the Federal seat of Robertson in the October election.  In June 1941, he was appointed Minister for War Organisation of Industry in the third Menzies Ministry, a position he retained until the fall of the Fadden government in October 1941. He lost his seat in the 1943 election.  He joined the new Liberal Party, but was almost expelled for questioning the White Australia Policy. He ran unsuccessfully against Prime Minister Ben Chifley in Macquarie in 1946.

Spooner died of cancer in Sydney in 1952, survived by his wife, three sons and daughter.

Notes

 

|-

|-

|-

Members of the Cabinet of Australia
United Australia Party members of the Parliament of Australia
Liberal Party of Australia politicians
Members of the New South Wales Legislative Assembly
Members of the Australian House of Representatives for Robertson
Members of the Australian House of Representatives
1891 births
1952 deaths
United Australia Party members of the Parliament of New South Wales
20th-century Australian politicians
Australian accountants